KWXL-LP (98.7 FM) is a high school radio station broadcasting a variety format. Licensed to Tucson, Arizona, United States, the station serves the Tucson area.  The station is currently owned by the Tucson Unified School District. KWXL-LP is Tucson's only high school radio station.  It is also a news radio station for students who attend Pueblo High Magnet School. Students broadcasting over the radio station are enrolled in a "Writing/Reporting for Broadcasting" class with instructor Sarah Wilson. Originally started by Douglas Potter, who retired in 2006. Listeners can also find FM 98.7, KWXL on iTunes.

References

External links 
 KWXL-LP official website
 

WXL-LP
WXL-LP
High school radio stations in the United States
Radio stations established in 2006
2006 establishments in Arizona